Lucien Bianchi (10 November 1934 – 30 March 1969), born Luciano Bianchi, was an Italian-born Belgian racing driver who raced for the Cooper, ENB, UDT Laystall and Scuderia Centro Sud teams in Formula One. He entered a total of 19 Formula One World Championship races, scoring six points and had a best finish of third at the 1968 Monaco Grand Prix.

He died in a testing crash in preparation for the 1969 24 Hours of Le Mans.

Personal life
Bianchi was born in Milan, Italy, but moved to Belgium in 1946 when he was still a child, with his father who was a race mechanic working, before the Second World War, in the Alfa Romeo competition department.  His brother, Mauro Bianchi, also became a racing driver. They drove to victory together in the 1965 Nürburgring 500 km. Mauro later won the P1.6 class at the 1967 24 Hours of Le Mans. His grandnephew, Jules Bianchi, who made his Formula One debut with the Marussia team for the  season competing under the French flag, also died as a result of injuries sustained in a racing accident.

Racing career
Lucien Bianchi's first race event was at the Alpine Rally in 1951. He won the 1957, 1958 and 1959 Tour de France as well as the Paris 1000 sports car race in the latter two years.

He entered Formula One in 1959, although only with sporadic appearances at first.  He drove various cars under the banner of the ENB team, including a Cooper T51, a Lotus 18 and an Emeryson.  After a couple of races for the UDT Laystall team in 1961, driving another Lotus, he returned to ENB for whom he drove their ENB-Maserati.  He finally secured a more regular drive in Formula One in 1968, with the Cooper-BRM team, although success was elusive despite a bright start. Bianchi managed his best Formula One performance, finishing third at the 1968 Monaco Grand Prix, in his first race for Cooper.

Bianchi also raced touring cars, sports cars and rally cars, being successful in all disciplines, his biggest victories coming in the 1968 24 Hours of Le Mans, behind the wheel of a Ford GT40 with Pedro Rodríguez and at Sebring in 1962 with Jo Bonnier. He was also leading the 1968 London–Sydney Marathon when his Citroën DS collided with a non-competing car on the closed course in Sydney.

He was killed when his Alfa Romeo T33 spun into a telegraph pole during Le Mans testing in 1969.

At Circuit Zolder, the fourth turn of the circuit, entering the back stretch, is named LucienBianchiBocht in his memory.

Racing record

Complete 24 Hours of Le Mans results

Formula One World Championship results
(key)

Complete USAC Championship Car results

Complete British Saloon Car Championship results
(key) (Races in bold indicate pole position; races in italics indicate fastest lap.)

Other race results
 Tour de France Automobile, 1st: 1957, 1958, 1959, 1964 / 2nd: 1961, 1963
 Spa 24 Hours, 1st: 1964 (in Class 5) overall 4th
 12 hours of Sebring, 1st: 1962, 1967
 12 Hours of Reims, 1st: 1965 (in class P1.3) overall 7th
 Targa Florio, 1st: 1965 (in class GT1.6) overall 7th
 6 Hours of Nürburgring, 1st: 1965
 6 Hours of Watkins Glen, 1st: 1968
 1000 km of Nürburgring, 1st: 1965 (in class S.16) overall 13th, 1967 (in class P+2.0) overall 4th
 1000km of Paris, 1st: 1960 / 2nd: 1961, 1967
 Mugello Grand Prix, 1st: 1968
 9 hours of Kyalami, 1st: 1968
 Grand Prix of Angola, 1st: 1962 / 2nd: 1964
 Grand Prix of Zolder, 1st: 1964
 500km of Nürburgring, 1st: 1965, 1963 (in class T1.0)
 Trophée d'Auvergne, 1st: 1963 (in class S/P+3.0)

References

External links
 GrandPrix.com — Bianchi's entry at GrandPrix.com

1934 births
1969 deaths
Racing drivers from Milan
Belgian Formula One drivers
Belgian racing drivers
Ecurie Nationale Belge Formula One drivers
British Racing Partnership Formula One drivers
Reg Parnell Racing Formula One drivers
Scuderia Centro Sud Formula One drivers
Cooper Formula One drivers
24 Hours of Le Mans drivers
24 Hours of Le Mans winning drivers
Racing drivers who died while racing
Sport deaths in France
World Sportscar Championship drivers
Italian emigrants to Belgium
12 Hours of Sebring drivers
12 Hours of Reims drivers